Põhimaantee 1 (ofcl. abbr. T1) is a 212-kilometre-long west-east national main road in Estonia. The road is part of the European route E20. The highway starts in Tallinn. From there the main cities passed are Maardu, Rakvere, Kohtla-Järve, Jõhvi and Sillamäe. The highway ends in Narva on Friendship Bridge, with a border crossing to Russia over the Narva river.

The road forms a major transport west-south transport route between Russia and Europe. In 2020, the highest traffic volumes were around Tallinn, with the AADT there being around 33,000. These are the highest figures in Estonia. The figures rise again around Narva, hovering around 8,000.

The road is a dual carriageway for 86.6 kilometres. The main part is between Tallinn and Haljala (till km 89.9) being the longest in Estonia. The remainder can be found between Kohtla-Järve and Jõhvi (km 156.0-163.2). There are plans to expand the entire highway to dual carriageway by sometime after 2030. Currently, sections in cities are being made free-flowing, with two intersections in Sillamäe being made grade separated in 2016 and 2021. Also, U-turns on the road are being demolished to improve safety and upgrade the road standards.

Route description
The T1 (Estonian: põhimaantee 1) is a major west–east highway in Estonia connecting the capital of the country, Tallinn, to the Virumaa region, where the highway follows a route parallel to the northern Estonian coast. The T1 is a part of the European route E20.

The route bypasses most cities – the only cities which the road goes through are Tallinn and Narva.
The highway begins in Tallinn from Viru Square and runs through the city for 10.7 kilometres. In the city, it intersects with the T2 in Ülemiste and the T11 on the city border, at Väo. After this, the Pirita river (and Tallinn city limits) are crossed. For 3.3 kilometres, the road is a 3+3 dual carriageway. Here, the road interchanges with the T11 and Saha-Loo road. The road turns into a 3+3 dual carriageway after one lane is lost at the T1/T94 interchange. The road continues in a straight, eastwards direction for the remainder of the dual carriageway section. Notable interchanges are with the T13, T85 and T24.

The road turns into a regular 1+1 road after intersecting with T23 at Haljala. For 72.5 kilometres, the road is a 1+1 highway. The road passes the first bigger town, Rakvere and near it intersects with the T5. Other notable intersections are with the T117 to Sonda and the T34 leading into Kiviõli. At Kohtla-Järve, the road is again a dual carriageway, staying like this for 11.8 kilometres. The road interchanges with the T93 on two occasions. At Jõhvi, a trumpet interchange leads to the T3. Shortly after this, the road turns into a 1+1 road, staying this way for the rest of the route. The road bypasses Sillamäe, a major port town. Shortly after this, the road intersects with the T91 leading to Narva-Jõesuu. Finally, the road reaches Narva and follows the path of Tallinna maantee. The road crosses the Narva river and ends at the Estonian-Russian border.

Currently there are 11 speed cameras on the T1, between kilometres 127 and 202.

Road length of lane

See also
 European route E20

References

External links

N1